This is a list of television programmes that are currently airing on Disney Channel in India.

Current programming

Animated series 
 Bapu
 Dr.Tenali Rama
 Beyblade
 Doraemon
 Gadget Guru Ganesha
 The Ghost and Molly McGee
 Ghostforce 
 Moka 
 Selfie With Bajrangi
 Upin and Ipin
 Guddu

Live action
 Best of Luck Nikki

Former programming

Live-action

Aaron Stone
Agadam Bagdam Tigdam
Akkad Bakkad Bambey Bo
Austin & Ally
Backyard Science
Bear in the Big Blue House
Best of Luck Nikki 
Big Bada Boom
The Book of Pooh
Boy Meets World
Break Time Masti Time
Captain Tiao
Cory in the House
Dhoom Machaao Dhoom
Disney Q Family Mastermind
Dog with a Blog
Gabbar Poonchwala
Goldie Ahuja Matric Pass
Goosebumps
Hannah Montana
Hatim
Hip Hip Hurray
Imagination Movers
Ishaan: Sapno Ko Awaaz De
Johnny and the Sprites
Jonas L.A.
Jessie
Karishma Kaa Karishma
Kaarthika
Kabhi Aise Geet Gaya Karo
Kya Mast Hai Life
Lage Raho Chachu
Life with Derek
Lizzie McGuire
Maan Na Maan Mein Tera Mehmaan
Mai Ka Lal
Mortified
Nach to the Groove
Naturally, Sadie
Oye Jassie
Palak Pe Jhalak
Phil of the Future
Sanya
Shaka Laka Boom Boom
Shake It Up (Indian TV series)
Shake It Up (U.S. TV series)
Shararat
So Random!
So Weird
Son Pari
Sonny with a Chance
Soy Luna
Soy Luna Live
Studio Disney
The Lodge (TV series)
The Next Step (Canadian TV series)
The Suite Life of Karan & Kabir
The Suite Life of Zack & Cody
The Suite Life on Deck
Take Two with Phineas and Ferb
That's So Raven
Vicky & Vetaal
Welcome to Pooh Corner
Wizards of Waverly Place
Zindagi Khatti Meethi
 Disney Fam Jam
 Operación Triunfo (Spanish TV series)
 Operación Triunfo (series 1)
 Operación Triunfo (series 2)
 Operación Triunfo (series 3)
 Operación Triunfo (series 4)
 Operación Triunfo (series 5)
 Operación Triunfo (series 6)
 Operación Triunfo (series 7)
 Operación Triunfo (series 8)
 Operación Triunfo (series 9)
 Operación Triunfo (series 10)
 Operación Triunfo (series 11)

Animated series
101 Dalmatians: The Series
3 Amigonauts
Action Dad
Aladdin
American Dragon: Jake Long
Astra Force
Arjun — Prince of Bali
Being Ian
Beyblade Burst Rise
Beyblade Burst Surge
Bhaagam Bhaag
Billy Dilley's Super-Duper Subterranean Summer
Brandy & Mr. Whiskers
Bunnytown
Buzz Lightyear of Star Command 
The Buzz on Maggie
Camp Lakebottom
Cars Toons
The Cat in the Hat Knows a Lot About That!
Chuggington
Clifford the Big Red Dog
Dave the Barbarian
The Deep
Donald Duck Presents
Donkey Kong Country
DuckTales 
Ek Tha Jungle
The Emperor's New School
Fillmore!
Fish Hooks
Gaju Bhai
Get Ace
Good Morning, Mickey!
Goof Troop 
Grami's Circus Show
Gravity Falls
Handy Manny
Higglytown Heroes
The Hive
Hotel Transylvania: The Series
House of Mouse
How to Draw?
Jake and the Never Land Pirates
JoJo's Circus
Jungle Cubs
Jungle Junction
Kid vs. Kat
Kim Possible
The Legend of Tarzan
Lilo & Stitch: The Series
The Lion Guard
Little Einsteins
The Little Mermaid
Madeline
Mickey and the Roadster Racers
Mickey Mouse and Friends
 Mickey Mouse Club
 Mickey Mouse Clubhouse
 Miles from Tomorrowland
 Miraculous: Tales of Ladybug & Cat Noir
 The New Adventures of Winnie the Pooh 
The Octonauts
Penn Zero: Part-Time Hero
PJ Masks
Pocoyo
The Proud Family
Quack Pack
Recess
Rolie Polie Olie
Sofia the First
Special Agent Oso
Stanley
Star Wars Rebels
Super V
TaleSpin
Teamo Supremo
Timon & Pumbaa
Tsum Tsum
V 4 Viraat
 Upin and Ipin
Wild About Safety
Wander Over Yonder
Yom
Hamtaro
Stitch!

Films
Feluda: The Kathmandu Caper (1 January 2011)
Luck Luck Ki Baat  (30 September 2012)
Apna Bhai Gaju Bhai (3 July 2016)

See also
Disney India
 List of Disney Channel (India) series
List of Indian animated television series
List of programmes broadcast by Hungama TV

References

Lists of television series by network
 
Indian television-related lists
Disney India Media Networks
Disney Channel related-lists